Ria Stars were a South African football club from Pietersburg. The club was owned by businesswoman Ria Ledwaba and nicknamed Manyora (Petty Thieves).

They were formed in 1989 and in 2000 they were promoted to the Premier Soccer League. In 2002 Ria Stars were bought out by the league for 8 million rand (roughly USD 800,000) in order to reduce fixture congestion.

References

Defunct soccer clubs in South Africa
Association football clubs established in 1989
Association football clubs disestablished in 2002
Polokwane
Soccer clubs in Limpopo
Former Premier Soccer League clubs
1989 establishments in South Africa
2002 disestablishments in South Africa